This is a list of rivers of Orange County, California, part of the Greater Los Angeles Area in Southern California.The Santa Ana River and San Gabriel River  are the largest in Orange County; their extensive watersheds extend into neighboring Los Angeles, Riverside and San Bernardino Counties. A number of smaller streams originate in or flow largely within Orange County, chief of which are Coyote Creek, Santiago Creek, San Diego Creek, Aliso Creek, and San Juan Creek. Many streams in the area received their names from Spanish explorers in the 18th century.

With the exception of mountain regions, Orange County is characterized by dense suburban and urban development. To protect the county's 3 million people from floods, many streams were channelized and/or lined with concrete in the 20th century. In addition, some wholly artificial streams were constructed to drain the large coastal wetlands and floodplains in north Orange County, namely in the Anaheim Bay watershed. Although the purpose of channelization is to carry floodwaters to the sea in an efficient manner, Orange County's streams have also been impacted by stormwater capture projects, to reduce the county's reliance on imported water. Such projects range from Irvine Lake – the county's largest body of fresh water, created by damming Santiago Creek in 1931 – to the extensive Santa Ana River groundwater recharge operations that provide as much as half the domestic water used in the county.

San Gabriel River watershed

The San Gabriel River flows mainly in Los Angeles County, and forms part of the border between Orange and Los Angeles Counties.

San Gabriel River
Coyote Creek
Carbon Creek
Moody Creek
Fullerton Creek
Brea Creek
Tonner Canyon
North Fork Coyote Creek (La Canada Verde Creek)
La Mirada Creek
Imperial Creek

Anaheim Bay watershed
Bolsa Chica Channel
Anaheim-Barber City Channel
Westminster Channel
Sunset Channel
East Garden Grove-Wintersburg Channel
Ocean View Channel

Santa Ana River watershed

The -long Santa Ana River begins in San Bernardino County and flows through Riverside County before bisecting northern Orange County.

Santa Ana River
Talbert Channel
Huntington Beach Channel
Greenville-Banning Channel
Santiago Creek
Handy Creek
Weir Canyon
Fremont Canyon
Limestone Canyon
Black Star Canyon
Silverado Canyon
Ladd Canyon
Williams Canyon
Pancho Canyon
Modjeska Canyon
Harding Canyon
Bear Trap Canyon
Walnut Canyon
Blue Mud Canyon
Gypsum Canyon
Coal Canyon

Newport Bay watershed

Santa Ana-Delhi Channel (Big Canyon)
Paularino Channel
Santa Ana Gardens Channel
San Diego Creek
Bonita Creek
Sand Canyon Wash
San Joaquin Wash
Lane Channel
Peters Canyon Wash
Santa Ana-Santa Fe Channel
Como Channel
El Modena-Irvine Channel
Central Irvine Channel
Hicks Canyon Wash
Rattlesnake Canyon Wash
Marshburn Channel
Bee Canyon Wash
Agua Chinon Creek
Borrego Canyon Wash
La Cañada Creek
Serrano Creek

Aliso Creek watershed

Aliso Creek
Wood Canyon Creek
Sulphur Creek
Narco Channel
Dairy Fork
Aliso Hills Channel
English Canyon Creek
Munger Creek

San Juan Creek watershed

San Juan Creek
Arroyo Trabuco (Trabuco Creek)
Oso Creek
La Paz Creek
Tijeras Canyon Creek
Live Oak Canyon Creek
Hickey Canyon Creek
Falls Canyon Creek
Holy Jim Creek
El Horno Creek
Cañada Chiquita
Cañada Gobernadora
Trampas Canyon
Bell Canyon
Crow Canyon
Dove Creek
Tick Creek
Verdugo Canyon
Lucas Canyon
Aliso Canyon
Cold Springs Canyon
Hot Springs Creek
Lion Canyon Creek
Long Canyon Creek

San Mateo Creek watershed
San Mateo Creek is mostly in Riverside and San Diego Counties, with only a small portion in Orange County; however, some of its tributaries extend into Orange County.
San Mateo Creek
Cristianitos Creek
Talega Canyon
Gabino Canyon

Coastal streams
A number of smaller streams flow into the Pacific Ocean along the Orange County coast. They are listed below from north to south. Waterways indicated in the above lists are italicized, to clarify location:

Newport Bay
Buck Gully
Los Trancos Canyon
Muddy Canyon
Moro Canyon
Emerald Canyon
Laguna Canyon
El Toro Creek
Aliso Creek
Salt Creek
Arroyo Salada Storm Channel
San Juan Creek
Prima Deshecha Cañada
Segunda Deshecha Cañada
San Mateo Creek

Notes

References

See also
 List of tributaries of the Santa Ana River
 List of rivers of California

External links
OC Watersheds

Orange County
Orange County